Pultenaea spinulosa is a species of flowering plant in the family Fabaceae and is endemic to the south of Western Australia. It is a shrub with flat, hairy leaves, and uniformly yellow flowers.

Description
Flowering occurs from September to October and the fruit is a flattened pod.

Taxonomy and naming
This species was first formally described in 1853 by Nikolai Turczaninow who gave it the name Euchilus spinulosus in the Bulletin de la Société impériale des naturalistes de Moscou from specimens collected by James Drummond. In 1864, George Bentham changed the name to Pultenaea spinulosa in Flora Australiensis. The specific epithet (spinulosa) means "spiny", referring to the tips of the leaves.

Distribution
This pultenaea grows on flats in the Esperance Plains and Mallee biogeographic regions in the south of Western Australia.

Conservation status
Pultenaea spinulosa is classified as "not threatened" by the Government of Western Australia Department of Biodiversity, Conservation and Attractions.

References

spinulosa
Eudicots of Western Australia
Plants described in 1853
Taxa named by Nikolai Turczaninow